William Littell Everitt (April 14, 1900 – September 6, 1986) was a noted American electrical engineer, educator, and founding member of the National Academy of Engineering. He received his Ph.D. from The Ohio State University in 1933. He was adviser of numerous outstanding scientists at OSU including Karl Spangenberg, and Nelson Wax. His PhD adviser was Frederic Columbus Blake.

Biography 
Everitt was born in Baltimore, Maryland. From 1918-1919 he served in the United States Marine Corps, then joined Cornell University to study electrical engineering where he received his E.E. degree in 1922. From 1922-1924 he worked at the North Electric Manufacturing Company of Galion, Ohio, on telephony switchboards, then studied electrical engineering at the University of Michigan where he received his M.A. in 1926. He then joined Ohio State University (OSU) as assistant professor, becoming associate professor (1929) and full professor (1933) when he received that institution's Ph.D. under Frederic Blake. His dissertation was entitled The Calculation and Design of Alternating Current Networks Employing Triodes Operating During a Portion of a Cycle. While at OSU he developed the theory of Class B and Class C electronic amplifiers.

In 1940 Everitt was appointed to the National Defense Research Committee's Communications Section, and in 1942 became director of operations research with the United States Army Signal Corps, for which he received the Exceptionally Meritorious Civilian Award (1946). He was then professor of electrical engineering and head of department at the University of Illinois at Urbana-Champaign (1944–49) and dean (1949–68). One of the engineering buildings there bears his name.

In his long career, Everitt was a radar pioneer and author of basic texts on radio engineering and communication. He invented automatic telephone equipment, a "time compressor" to accelerate recorded speech, high-power radio amplification, a frequency modulation radio altimeter, and several antenna matching and feeding systems. His textbook Communications Engineering, first published in 1932, was a classic in the field.

Everitt became Institute of Radio Engineers Fellow (1938), President (1945), and received its IEEE Medal of Honor in 1954 "for his distinguished career as author, educator and scientist; for his contributions in establishing electronics and communications as a major branch of electrical engineering; for his unselfish service to his country; for his leadership in the affairs of the Institute of Radio Engineers." He was named to the National Academy of Engineering in 1964. Everitt was also a Fellow of AIEE, and a member of the American Association for the Advancement of Science, the American Society for Engineering Education, the Acoustical Society of America, Eta Kappa Nu, the National Council of Tau Beta Pi, and Sigma Xi, and received 10 honorary doctorate degrees.

Everitt's daughter, Barbara Everitt Bryant, became the first woman to direct the United States Census Bureau.

Selected works 
  Communication engineering, 1st ed., New York London, McGraw-Hill, 1932.

Notes

References 
 IEEE History Center biography
 National Academy of Engineering biography
 American Institute of Physics. Early 1930s Ph.D.s Project. Responses to Early Ph.D.s Survey, 1980
 Mathematics Genealogy Project
 SMU Honorary Degrees
 UIUC History biography
 UIUC Library Archive collection
 UIUC Faculty biography
 

1900 births
1986 deaths
20th-century American engineers
Founding members of the United States National Academy of Engineering
IEEE Medal of Honor recipients
Cornell University College of Engineering alumni
Ohio State University faculty
University of Illinois Urbana-Champaign faculty
University of Michigan College of Engineering alumni
Fellow Members of the IEEE
Fellows of the American Association for the Advancement of Science
Microwave engineers